The 1967–68 snooker season, the last season before the modern era of snooker, was a series of snooker tournaments played between July 1967 and June 1968. The following table outlines the results for the season's events.


Calendar

New professionals
The following players turned professional during the season: Gary Owen and Ray Reardon. Billiards and Snooker magazine reported in June 1968 that Alex Higgins had turned professional, but in October 1968 he was competing as an amateur.

Notes

References

1967
1967 in snooker
1968 in snooker